Agyneta cauta is a species of sheet weaver found in the Palearctic. It was described by O.P.-Cambridge in 1902.

References

cauta
Spiders described in 1902
Palearctic spiders